Charles Snowden (born March 27, 1998) is an American football outside linebacker for the Tampa Bay Buccaneers of the National Football League (NFL). He played college football at Virginia.

Early life and high school
Snowden grew up in Silver Spring, Maryland, and initially attended James Hubert Blake High School, where he played basketball and junior varsity football, before transferring to St. Albans School in Washington, D.C. after his freshman year. He enrolled with intention on focusing only on basketball, but Snowden returned to football during his junior year. Snowden committed to play college football at Virginia over an offer to play college basketball at St. Francis (PA).

College career
Snowden became a starter in his sophomore season and finished second on the team with 7.5 tackles for loss along with 2.5 sacks and two interceptions. As a junior, he was named honorable mention All-Atlantic Coast Conference after recording 11 tackles for loss, five sacks and 11 quarterback hurries. Snowden started the first eight games of his senior season before breaking his ankle in a win over Abilene Christian and was named second-team All-ACC after leading the Cavaliers with six sacks and 10 tackles for loss.

Professional career

Chicago Bears
Snowden signed with the Chicago Bears as an undrafted free agent shortly after the conclusion of the 2021 NFL Draft. He was waived on August 31, 2021 and re-signed to the practice squad the next day. On December 11, Snowden was promoted to the active roster in advance of the team's game against the Green Bay Packers. Snowden would make his NFL debut in the same game.

He signed a reserve/future contract with the Bears on January 11, 2022. He was waived on August 30, 2022.

Tampa Bay Buccaneers
Snowden was signed to the Tampa Bay Buccaneers practice squad on November 8, 2022. He signed a reserve/future contract on January 17, 2023.

References

External links
Virginia Cavaliers bio

1998 births
Living people
Players of American football from Maryland
Sportspeople from Montgomery County, Maryland
American football linebackers
People from Silver Spring, Maryland
Virginia Cavaliers football players
Chicago Bears players
Tampa Bay Buccaneers players